Iraq participated in the 2014 Asian Games in Incheon, South Korea from 19 September to 4 October 2014.

Medal summary

Medal by sport

Medalists

Last updated 27 August 2016

Archery

Men's recurve

Women's recurve

Men's compound

Women's compound

Athletics (track and field)

Men
Track & road events

Field events

Women
Track & road events

Boxing

Men

Canoeing

Sprint
Men

Football

Men's tournament

Team roster
Head coach: Hakeem Shaker

Group play

Round of 16

Quarterfinal

Semifinal

Bronze medal match

Rowing

Men

Qualification Legend: FA=Final A (medal); FB=Final B (non-medal); FC=Final C (non-medal); FD=Final D (non-medal); FE=Final E (non-medal); FF=Final F (non-medal); SA/B=Semifinals A/B; SC/D=Semifinals C/D; SE/F=Semifinals E/F; QF=Quarterfinals; R=Repechage

Weightlifting

Men

 Mohammed Jassim originally finished 7th, but was disqualified after he tested positive for Etiocholanolone.

Wrestling

Men's freestyle

Men's Greco-Roman

References

Nations at the 2014 Asian Games
2014
Asian Games